The Surtees TS9 was a Formula One car used by Surtees during the 1971, 1972 and 1973 Formula One seasons. It was designed by John Surtees and Peter Connew.

Racing history

1971-1973: Surtees
The TS9 made its debut at the 1971 South African Grand Prix, Only one chassis was available for English driver/owner John Surtees but he retired with a gearbox problem. A second car was available for German Rolf Stommelen for Spain but the German retired with fuel pressure failure and Surtees finished 11th, At the Monaco Grand Prix Stommelen finished sixth and Surtees seventh. For Holland the Englishman finished fifth and the German was disqualified for being push-started by marshals after he spun. At the French Grand Prix Surtees finished eighth and Stommelen 11th. Derek Bell joined Stommelen and Surtees For Britain. Bell retired and Stommelen finished fifth with Surtees sixth, At the German Grand Prix, the Englishman finished seventh and the German tenth. In Austria, the Englishman retired with engine failure and the German finished seventh. English driver Mike Hailwood joined Stommelen and Surtees for the Italian Grand Prix and finished fourth. Stommelen retired with an accident after the start and Surtees also retired with engine failure. In Canada, the Englishman finished 11th and the German retired with overheating. Two changes followed, Stommelen was replaced by American Sam Posey and Hailwood returned to join Surtees before the United States Grand Prix. Hailwood finished 15th, Surtees 17th and Posey retired with piston failure.

The Surtees team updated the TS9 into the TS9B but used a different driver lineup. John Surtees retired from driving to take on the management side of the team and hired Australian Tim Schenken and Italian Andrea de Adamich. The season began with the 1972 Argentine Grand Prix, Schenken finished fifth and de Adamich retired with fuel system failure. Englishman Mike Hailwood joined Schenken and de Adamich for South Africa. The Italian was ten laps down and was not classified. The Englishman retired with broken suspension and the Australian also retired with engine failure. The Spanish Grand Prix saw de Adamich fourth, Schenken eighth and Hailwood retire with an electrical fault. At Monaco, the Italian finished seventh but the Englishman and the Australian both retired with accidents in the wet weather. The Belgian Grand Prix saw Hailwood fourth, Schenken retire with overheating and de Adamich also retire with engine failure. At France, the Englishman finished sixth, the Italian 14th and the Australian 17th. All three drivers retired at the British Grand Prix, Schenken with broken suspension, Hailwood with a broken gearbox and de Adamich with an accident. At Germany, the Italian finished 13th, the Australian 14th and the Englishman retired with broken suspension. The Austrian Grand Prix saw Hailwood fourth, Schenken 11th and de Adamich 14th, At Italy, the Englishman finished second, the Italian retired with brake failure and the Australian also retired when he spun off. Surtees only entered Schenken and de Adamich for the Canadian Grand Prix. Schenken finished seventh and de Adamich retired with a broken gearbox. For the United States, Schenken drove the Surtees TS14 and Hailwood returned but finished 17th after an accident and de Adamich retired also through accident.

De Adamich returned for South Africa and finished eighth, in the last race for the TS9B.

1972:Team Gunston
Team Gunston bought a TS9 from Surtees and hired Rhodesian John Love for the 1972 South African Grand Prix. He finished 16th despite having an accident caused by a puncture.

1972:Champcar Inc.
Champcar Inc. brought a TS9B from Surtees and hired American Sam Posey for the 1972 United States Grand Prix who finished 12th.

Complete Formula One World Championship results 
(key) (results in italics indicate fastest lap)

Non-Championship Formula One results
(key) (Races in bold indicate pole position)
(Races in italics indicate fastest lap)

References

Surtees TS09